Carolina On The Hill is a historic condominium building located on Capitol Hill in Washington, DC.  Its address is 101 N. Carolina Ave, SE, Washington, DC, 20003.

Architecture

History 

Residential condominiums in Washington, D.C.